Phleger may refer to:

 Phleger Dome, a mountain in Antarctica
 Phleger Estate, a park in San Mateo County, California
 Herman Phleger (1890-1984), San Francisco attorney, namesake of the Phleger Estate
 Brobeck, Phleger & Harrison, a former law firm in San Francisco, California
 Kelley Phleger, current wife (since 1999) of actor Don Johnson, former long-time girlfriend of Gavin Newsom